The 2010 Curlers Corner Autumn Gold Curling Classic was held from October 8 to 11 at the Calgary Curling Club in Calgary, Alberta. It was the 33rd edition of the event, and it marked the fifth time that the event was held as a Grand Slam event. The total purse of the event was CAD$52,000. The event featured 32 teams, six from outside Canada. The teams played in a triple knockout format, followed by a playoff round for the eight qualifiers from the knockout round.

The winning team was the Chinese national team (skipped by Wang Bingyu), which received CAD$14,000 in prize money. They defeated Desirée Owen in the final. It was the first time ever that a non-Canadian team won a Grand Slam event in either a men's or women's slam.

Teams

Results

A Event

B Event

C Event

Playoffs

External links
WCT Site 

Autumn Gold Curling Classic
2010 in Canadian curling
2010 in Alberta
2010 in women's curling